MIM Holdings Limited was an Australian mining company created in 1970 as the parent company of Mount Isa Mines Limited, which operates the Mount Isa mines in north-west Queensland. Based in Brisbane, the capital city of the Australian state of Queensland, MIM Holdings owned and/or operated coal, gold, and base metal mines in Australia and Argentina. It also operated lead and copper smelters in Mount Isa, a copper refinery in Townsville (Queensland), a lead refinery at Northfleet (England), zinc smelters using the Imperial Smelting Process at the National Smelting Company located within Avonmouth Docks (England) and Duisburg (Germany), and a precious metals refinery in Sydney.

It also held, at some stages, cross-shareholdings in ASARCO, Cominco and Metallgesellschaft. It sold its interests in Cominco and Metallgesellschaft during the 1993–1994 Australian financial year.

MIM Holdings was responsible for several significant technological advances in the mining industry, including the Isa Process tank house technology, developed at its subsidiary Copper Refineries Pty Limited in Townsville, Queensland; the Bottom-blown oxygen converter ("BBOC") developed at its lead refining subsidiary, Britannia Refined Metals, at Northfleet in England; and the ISASMELT top-entry submerged lance smelting process, Jameson Cell flotation technology, and the IsaMill fine grinding technology, all developed at its Mount Isa Mines Limited operations in Mount Isa.

MIM Holdings was taken over by Xstrata for a total of US$2.96 billion (A$4.93 billion), including assumed debt, in 2003, and delisted from the Australian Stock Exchange on 30 June 2003. At that time, MIM Holdings was one of the world's biggest coal exporters.

On 2 May 2013, Xstrata merged with Glencore to form Glencore Xstrata plc.

References

Non-renewable resource companies established in 1970
Companies based in Queensland
Mount Isa
Zinc smelters
Non-renewable resource companies disestablished in 2003
2003 mergers and acquisitions
Mining companies of Australia
Lead companies
Zinc companies
Coal companies of Australia
Gold mining companies of Australia
Metal companies of Australia
Australian companies disestablished in 2003
Australian companies established in 1970